D. americana  may refer to:
 Dasyatis americana, the southern stingray, a stingray species found in tropical and subtropical waters of the southern Atlantic Ocean, Caribbean Sea and Gulf of Mexico
 Diarrhena americana, the American beak grass or American beakgrain, a native, perennial grass species of North America

See also
 Americana (disambiguation)